Below is a list of notable footballers who have played for Salernitana Calcio 1919. Generally, this means players that have played 100 or more league matches for the club. However, some players who have played fewer matches are also included; this includes players that have had considerable success at other clubs, and players who have appeared at least once in the FIFA World Cup.

Key
 GK — Goalkeeper
 DF — Defender
 MF — Midfielder
 FW — Forward

Nationalities are indicated by the corresponding FIFA country code.

References and notes

Players
 
Salernitana

Association football player non-biographical articles